The UK Singles Chart is one of many music charts compiled by the Official Charts Company that calculates the best-selling singles of the week in the United Kingdom. Before 2004, the chart was only based on the sales of physical singles. This list shows singles that peaked in the Top 10 of the UK Singles Chart during 1997, as well as singles which peaked in 1996 and 1998 but were in the top 10 in 1997. The entry date is when the single appeared in the top 10 for the first time (week ending, as published by the Official Charts Company, which is six days after the chart is announced).

Two hundred and twenty-eight singles were in the top ten in 1997. Ten singles from 1996 remained in the top 10 for several weeks at the beginning of the year. "Angels" by Robbie Williams and "Never Ever" by All Saints were both released in 1997 but did not reach their peak until 1998. Sixty-four artists scored multiple entries in the top 10 in 1997. All Saints, Aqua, Daft Punk, Natalie Imbruglia and No Doubt were among the many artists who achieved their first UK charting top 10 single in 1997.

Elton John recorded a reworking of his 1973 single "Candle in the Wind as a tribute to Diana, Princess of Wales, who died in 1997. Released as a double-A side with "Something About the Way You Look Tonight" and spending five weeks at number-one, it sold almost 4.8 million copies and remains (as of 2018) the best-selling single of all-time. The other major event to impact the charts in 1997 was the passing of The Notorious B.I.G. A tribute song by Puff Daddy, the rapper's wife Faith Evans and R&B group 112, "I'll Be Missing You" which sampled The Police's "Every Breath You Take", ranked as the third best-selling single of the year.

The 1996 Christmas number-one, "2 Become 1" by Spice Girls, remained at number-one for the first two weeks of 1997. The first new number-one single of the year was "Professional Widow (It's Got to Be Big)" by Tori Amos. Overall, twenty-four different singles peaked at number-one in 1997, with Spice Girls (4) having the most singles hit that position.

Background

Multiple entries
Two-hundred and twenty-eight singles charted in the top 10 in 1997, with two-hundred and sixteen singles reaching their peak this year.

Sixty-four artists scored multiple entries in the top 10 in 1997. U2 frontman Bono and the five members of Boyzone shared the record for the most top ten singles in 1997 with five hit singles each. Four of Bono's entries were with the band, the most successful of which was the number-one hit "Discothèque" in February. "Staring at the Sun" peaked at number 3 in April, "Please" made number 7 in September and "Last Night on Earth" reached number 10 in July. His other appearance was on the BBC charity single for Children in Need, "Perfect Day", alongside artists such as Boyzone, David Bowie, Elton John and the original composer of the song Lou Reed. The song entered the chart in November and spent 3 weeks at number-one, and 9 weeks in the top 10. Along with U2, eight other acts had four singles in the top 10: 911, Backstreet Boys, Boyzone, Brett Anderson (from the britpop band Suede), George Michael, Spice Girls and Texas

No Doubt were one of a number of artists with two top-ten entries, including the number-one single "Don't Speak". All Saints, Daft Punk, Jon Bon Jovi, Oasis and Toni Braxton were among the other artists who had multiple top 10 entries in 1997.

Chart debuts
Eighty-five artists achieved their first top 10 single in 1997, either as a lead or featured artist. Of these, fourteen went on to record another hit single that year: All Saints, The Course, Daft Punk, DJ Quicksilver, Eels, Hanson, Kavana, Mansun, No Doubt, No Mercy, The Notorious B.I.G., Orbital, The Seahorses and Shola Ama. Sash! and The Verve both had two other entries in their breakthrough year.

The following table (collapsed on desktop site) does not include acts who had previously charted as part of a group and secured their first top 10 solo single.

Notes
Makaveli was a pseudonym used by the late Tupac Shakur, who had charted at number six under the name 2Pac in 1996 with "California Love", alongside Dr. Dre. The Seahorses was formed by former The Stone Roses guitarist John Squire. His old group had debuted in 1989 with "Fools Gold"/"What the World is Waiting For", a number 8 hit.

"Midnight in Chelsea" was Jon Bon Jovi's first single to make an impact without his bandmates, peaking at number four. He had a second hit single this year, "Queen of New Orleans", which reached number 10. Will Smith first made the chart in the duo DJ Jazzy Jeff and the Fresh Prince using his character name from The Fresh Prince of Bel-Air. The single "Men in Black" was the first time he charted under his own name.

The "Perfect Day" charity single brought together musicians and performers from across entertainment, both established and new to the UK charts but performing as this line-up for the first time. The solo artists with previous chart credits were David Bowie, Elton John, Gabrielle, Joan Armatrading, Laurie Anderson, Lou Reed, Suzanne Vega and Tom Jones. Several artists had made the charts with their groups before, including Bono (U2), Brett Anderson (Suede), Heather Small (M People), Huey Morgan (Fun Lovin' Criminals), Ian Broudie (The Lightning Seeds), Shane MacGowan (The Pogues), as well as Keith Duffy, Michael Graham, Ronan Keating, Shane Lynch and Stephen Gately (all Boyzone). Additionally, conductor Andrew Davis, the BBC Symphony Orchestra, string group Brodsky Quartet, soprano saxophone player Courtney Pine and tenor horn player Sheona White all played on the track.

Songs from films
Original songs from various films entered the top 10 throughout the year. These included "Ain't Nobody" and "Love Rollercoaster" (from Beavis & Butthead Do America), "Rumble in the Jungle" (When We Were Kings), "I Believe I Can Fly" and "Hit 'Em High (The Monstars' Anthem)" (Space Jam), "Another Suitcase in Another Hall" (Evita), "The Saint" (The Saint), "Lovefool" (Romeo + Juliet), "The End Is the Beginning Is the End" and "Gotham City" (Batman & Robin), "Men in Black" (Men in Black), "James Bond Theme" (Tomorrow Never Dies), "You Sexy Thing" (The Full Monty) and "Spice Up Your Life" and "Too Much" (Spiceworld: The Movie).

Charity singles

Best-selling singles
Elton John had the best-selling single of the year with "Something About the Way You Look Tonight"/"Candle in the Wind 1997". The song spent thirteen weeks in the top 10 (including five weeks at number one), sold over 4.77 million copies and was certified 8× platinum by the BPI. "Barbie Girl" by Aqua came in second place, selling more than 1.5 million copies and losing out by around 3.27 million sales. Puff Daddy & Faith Evans featuring 112's "I'll Be Missing You", "Perfect Day" from Various Artists and "Teletubbies say "Eh-oh!" " by Teletubbies made up the top five. Singles by Will Smith, No Doubt, Natalie Imbruglia, Spice Girls and Chumbawamba were also in the top ten best-selling singles of the year.

"Something About the Way You Look Tonight"/"Candle in the Wind 1997" (1) was ranked as the best-selling single of the decade, while "Barbie Girl" (4), "Perfect Day" (6) and "I'll Be Missing You" (9) were all ranked in the top 10 best-selling singles of the 1990s. "Something About the Way You Look Tonight"/"Candle in the Wind 1997" also stands as the biggest-selling single of all time in the UK (as of July 2018).

Top-ten singles
Key

Entries by artist

The following table shows artists who achieved two or more top 10 entries in 1997, including singles that reached their peak in 1996 or 1998. The figures include both main artists and featured artists, while appearances on ensemble charity records are also counted for each artist.

Notes

 "Never Ever" reached its peak of number-one on 17 January 1998 (week ending).
 "Professional Widow (It's Got to Be Big)" originally peaked at number 20 upon its initial release in 1996. It was remixed by Armand van Helden and re-released in 1997, reaching number-one in January.
 "Remember Me" re-entered the top 10 at number on 15 February 1997 (week ending).
 The original solo version of "You Got the Love" by Candi Staton peaked at number 95 in 1986. The 1991 remix by The Source peaked at number 4.
 The original version of "Show Me Love" peaked at number 6 upon its release in 1993.
 "Bellissima" charted as a double A-side single with another song, "I Have a Dream", across Europe in 1996 but only "Bellissima" reached the UK chart.
 Makaveli was a stage name used by American rapper Tupac Shakur (sometimes known alternatively as 2Pac).
 "Lovefool" originally peaked outside the top ten at number 21 upon its initial release in September 1996.
 "Hypnotize" was the last single released by The Notorious B.I.G. before his death.
 "Love Shine a Light" was the United Kingdom's winning entry at the Eurovision Song Contest in 1997.
 "I'll Be There for You" was the theme song from the television series Friends. It originally peaked at number 3 upon its initial release in 1995.
 "6 Underground" originally peaked outside the top ten at number 15 upon its initial release in October 1996.
 "I'll Be Missing You" was recorded as a tribute to The Notorious B.I.G. after he was shot dead. It featured his wife Faith Evans alongside Puff Daddy and R&B group 112 and included a sample of "Every Breath You Take" by The Police.
 "Bitter Sweet Symphony" uses a sample of "The Last Time"  by The Rolling Stones. It was the subject of a legal challenge regarding plagiarism, and as a result Mick Jagger and Keith Richards had subsequent songwriting credits added.
 "Just a Girl" originally peaked outside the top ten at number 38 upon its initial release October 1996.
 "Bitch" was sometimes known by its censored title "Nothing in Between".
 "California Dreamin' originally peaked outside the top ten at number 23 upon its initial release in 1966.
 "Mo Money Mo Problems" was the first single released since The Notorious B.I.G.'s tragic death, and charted posthumously at number six.
 "Never Gonna Let You Go" re-entered the top 10 at number on 13 September 1997 (week ending), and at number on 27 September 1997 (week ending).
 "Candle in the Wind 1997" was released as a tribute to Diana, Princess of Wales who died in 1997. 
 "Something About the Way You Look Tonight"/"Candle in the Wind 1997" re-entered the top 10 at number 10 on 6 December 1997 (week ending), at number 10 on 20 December 1997 (week ending) and at number 10 on 3 January 1998 (week ending).
 "On Her Majesty's Secret Service" was remixed by Propellerheads for the Shaken and Stirred: The David Arnold James Bond Project, an album of cover versions of James Bond theme songs.
 "You Sexy Thing" originally peaked at number 2 upon its initial release in 1975. A Ben Liebrand remix of the song was released in 1987 and peaked at number 10. In 1997, the original version of "You Sexy Thing" was re-released after it featured in the successful comedy film The Full Monty. This re-release peaked at number 6.
 Released as the official single for Children in Need.
 "Perfect Day" was credited to Various artists which included Lou Reed, David Bowie, Tom Jones and Boyzone. 
 "Teletubbies Say "Eh-oh"" was a remix of the theme tune from the Teletubbies children's television series. It spent two weeks at number-one in December but narrowly lost out to "Too Much" by Spice Girls for the Christmas number-one.
 Figure includes an appearance on the "Perfect Day" charity single.
 Figure includes four top 10 hits with the group U2.
 Figure includes single that peaked in 1996.
 Figure includes four top 10 hits with the group Boyzone.
 Figure includes three top 10 hits with the group Suede.
 Figure includes single that peaked in 1998.

See also
1997 in British music
List of UK Singles Chart number ones of the 1990s

References
General

Specific

External links
1997 singles chart archive at the Official Charts Company (click on relevant week)
Official Top 40 best-selling songs of 1997 at the Official Charts Company

United Kingdom
Top 10 singles
1997